Prior to and during World War II the United States Army called several tractors M1 Light Tractor. Under the Ordnance Corps these "off the shelf" tractors were meant to tow artillery pieces so were not equipped with blades like their Engineer counterparts. Eventually these were replaced by purpose built "High Speed Tractors" (HST). Some tractors were equipped with crane attachments for ammunition, and material handling.

Variants
G015 M1 Light Ordnance Tractor
G036 Light Tractor, 3,5-Ton, Cletrac 20c
Light Tractor Caterpillar R-4
G151 Light Tractor Caterpillar D-4 (not yet known for sure if it was called M1)
G099 Light Tractor IH TD-9 (called M1?)

Gallery

Detailed information on Caterpillar D4
TB 5-9720-11 (1944) gives the following detailed information:

TRACTOR, CRAWLER, DIESEL, 35 TO 40-DBHP, 
STANDARD, CATERPILLAR, D4

Manufacturer: Caterpillar Tractor Co. Stock No.: 78-8138.0-44 
Peoria, Illinois
Model: D4

1. General. — The D4 is designed for towing and all types of general 
construction work. Accurately located frame-holes are provided 
for attaching varied tractor equipment to adapt it for use in 
earth moving, road clearance, and airport construction work.

2. References. — For further information regarding this equipment, 
refer to: TM 5-3110; ASF Catalog, Section ENG 7-T31, ENG 
8-T31.

3. Engine. — Make: Caterpillar. Model: D4. Fuel: Diesel commercial. Cylinders: 4. Bore and Stroke: 4}£ x 5K-in. Governed speed: 1400 rpm. Valve adjustment: 0.010-in. Firing 
order: 1-3-4-2. Equipped with Independent, 2-cylinder, 
4-stroke-cycle gasoline starting engine.

4. Fuel, coolant, and lubrication data. — Fuel tank: 25-gal fuel oil. 
Radiator: 11 -gal water. Crankcase: 4-gal engine oil. Transmission: 5-gal gear oil. Final drive cases: 1%-gal gear oil each. 
Engine oil grade: OE-30 above 32 F, OE-10 below 32 °F. 
Gear oil grade: GO-90 above 32 F, GO-80 below 32 °F.

5. Speeds and drawbar pull. — Five forward speeds and one reverse. 
Reverse speed: 1.9 mph. Forward speeds with maximum 
drawbar pull are: 1st: 1.7 mph, 7852 lb. 2nd: 2.4 mph, 
5811 lb. 3rd: 3.0 mph, 4541 lb. 4th: 3.7 mph, 3471 lb. 5th: 
5.4-mph, 2230-lb.

6. Clutch. — Power is transmitted through dry type flywheel clutch 
to selective type change speed gear set. Each track is controlled by slow speed, heavy duty, dry multiple disc clutch.

7. Brakes. — Contracting band brakes.

8. Crawlers. — Gage, center to center of tracks: 44-in. Track length: 
61%-in. Track shoe width: 13-in. Grouser height: 2 in. 
Track shoes, each side: 31. Ground contact: 1589 sq in.

9. Attachments. — The following attachments are issued as standard 
equipment with the D4 Caterpillar: ANGLEDOZER, LaPlante-Choate 4R. ANGLEDOZER, LeTourneau C-4. BULL- 
DOZER, LaPlante-Choate or LeTourneau A-4. POWER 
CONTROL UNIT, LeTourneau T-4. COMBINATION 
POWER CONTROL UNIT AND WINCH, LeTourneau, 
HN. WINCH, Hyster D-4A. WINCH, Hyster D4.

10. Dimensions. — Length: 121% 6 in. Width: 62 in. Height: 60% in. 
Drawbar height: 13%-in. Turning radius: 74-in.

11. Working weight. — Without attachments: 10,000-lb.

12. Shipping data. — Boxed for export (tractor only), completely 
assembled. No. of boxes: 1. Length: 126-in. Width: 68-in. 
Height: 69-in. Cubage: 343 cu ft. Weight: 11,600-lb.

Military service
An iconic vehicle used by the Seabees during [WW2] Seabee. Often seen with the term "Natasha", the name of the bulldozer in the John Wayne movie "The Fighting Seabees"The Fighting Seabees. It was equipped with a plow and shipped off to islands in the pacific to help build a variety of items, including Airstrips, Supply Depots, and Roads.

See also
List of U.S. military vehicles by model number
List of U.S. military vehicles by supply catalog designation
M2 Light Tractor
M1 Heavy Tractor
M1 Medium Tractor

References
* TM 5-3222 IHC T-9 TRACTOR
TM 5-3110 Caterpillar D4

World War II vehicles of the United States